Ludwik Synowiec (19 January 1958 – 21 December 2022) was a Polish ice hockey player. He played for the Poland men's national ice hockey team at the 1980 Winter Olympics in Lake Placid, and the 1984 Winter Olympics in Sarajevo.

Synowiec died on 21 December 2022, at the age of 64.

References

1958 births
2022 deaths
Ice hockey players at the 1980 Winter Olympics
Ice hockey players at the 1984 Winter Olympics
Olympic ice hockey players of Poland
Polish ice hockey defencemen
Sportspeople from Katowice
Naprzód Janów players
GKS Tychy (ice hockey) players
Kassel Huskies players
Silesian University of Technology alumni
Polish expatriate sportspeople in Germany